"Project Dreams" is a song by American producer Marshmello and American rapper Roddy Ricch. It was released on December 7, 2018.

Critical reception
HotNewHipHop was positive about the song, and called Roddy Ricch a "young up-and-comer" that "continues to show why he's next up". Billboard called the track "an instant earworm, and it's paired with a straightforward video", saying there's "something so funky about Ricch's sing-song flow. He brings the melody to Marshmello's snare-forward, drum-machine beat. The song was featured as part of the video game MLB The Show 19 soundtrack."

Charts

Certifications

References

2018 singles
2018 songs
Marshmello songs
Roddy Ricch songs
Songs written by Marshmello
Songs written by Roddy Ricch